Aa Divasam is a 1982 Indian Malayalam-language film directed and produced by M. Mani and written by Jagathy N. K. Achari from a story by Mani. The film stars Mammootty, Sukumaran, and Jagathy Sreekumar, and also features Mohanlal. The film has musical score by Shyam.

Plot

Aa Divasam is an action film where lead players hunger for revenge.

Cast

Mohanlal 
Sukumaran as Dr. Rajan
Jagathy Sreekumar as Rajappan
Mammootty as Balachandran IPS
Aryad Gopalakrishnan
Bheeman Raghu
Jyothi
Kunchan as Pappan
Noohu
Ranipadmini
Sathyakala
Migdad

Soundtrack
The music was composed by Shyam and the lyrics were written by Chunakkara Ramankutty.

References

External links
 

1982 films
1980s Malayalam-language films
Films directed by M. Mani